Turpentine Run is a stream in the United States Virgin Islands.

Rivers of the United States Virgin Islands